This is a list of number-one songs in 1979 on the Italian charts compiled weekly by the Italian Hit Parade Singles Chart.

Chart history

Number-one artists

References

1979
1979 in Italian music
1979 record charts